The tit-tyrants are a group of small, mainly Andean, tyrant flycatchers found in the genera Anairetes and Uromyias.

The tit-tyrants are fairly small birds (11–14 cm) that get their common name from the tit family, due to their energetic tit-like dispositions and appearance, primarily in their crests. Tit-tyrants live in temperate or arid scrub habitats and are mainly found in the Andes mountains. It is one of only a few genera of small flycatchers that occur at such high altitudes.

Species

Anairetes
 Ash-breasted tit-tyrant, Anairetes alpinus
 Black-crested tit-tyrant, Anairetes nigrocristatus
 Pied-crested tit-tyrant, Anairetes reguloides
 Yellow-billed tit-tyrant, Anairetes flavirostris
 Juan Fernández tit-tyrant, Anairetes fernandezianus
 Tufted tit-tyrant, Anairetes parulus

Uromyias
 Agile tit-tyrant, Uromyias agilis
 Unstreaked tit-tyrant, Uromyias agraphia

References

Cited texts
 

Tyrannidae
Taxonomy articles created by Polbot
Bird common names